Abdoulaye Dabo (born 4 March 2001) is a French professional footballer who plays as a midfielder for Greek Super League club Levadiakos, on loan from Olympiacos B.

Club career

Nantes 
Coming through the youth system, Dabo signed his first professional contract with Nantes on 4 October 2017, at the age of 16. He became the youngest player in the club's history to sign a professional contract. Dabo made his professional debut for Nantes in a Ligue 1 match again Monaco on 11 August 2018.

After two Ligue 1 games, Dabo played for the reserve team in the National 2, the fourth tier of French football. His first 2018–19 game was on 15 September 2018, in a 1–0 home defeat to Le Havre II. Dabo's first goal came one week later, on 22 September, in a 2–1 away defeat to Saint-Malo. He played six games throughout the season, scoring twice. In the 2019–20 season, Dabo played 14 games, scoring three, whereas in the first half of the 2020–21 season, he played five games.

Loan to Juventus U23 
On 13 January 2021, Dabo joined Serie C side Juventus U23 – the reserve team of Juventus – on a six-month loan with a purchase option. On 17 January, he made his debut for Juventus U23 in a 1–1 draw against Piacenza.

Olympiacos 
On 31 January 2022, Dabo signed for Super League Greece club Olympiacos on a contract until 2026.

Loan to Levadiakos 
On 5 January 2023, Dabo was loaned to Levadiakos until the end of the season.

International career
Born in France, Dabo is of Guinean descent. He is a youth international for France, having represented them at under-16, under-17, and under-18 levels.

Style of play 
Dabo began as a central midfielder in front of the defence. He is a left-footed quick and dynamic player, who is also known for his dribbling. During his last two years at Nantes II, Dabo moved to a more offensive position, often playing as a left midfielder.

Career statistics

References

External links

 
 
 
 

2001 births
Living people
French sportspeople of Guinean descent
Footballers from Nantes
French footballers
Association football midfielders
Ligue 1 players
FC Nantes players
Championnat National 2 players
Juventus Next Gen players
France youth international footballers
Black French sportspeople
Olympiacos F.C. B players
French expatriate sportspeople in Greece
French expatriate sportspeople in Italy
Expatriate footballers in Greece
Expatriate footballers in Italy
French expatriate footballers